The Elephant Packing House was built in 1924, in Fullerton, Orange County, Southern California. Valencia oranges were packed here, from the abundant orchards that then dominated the county and gave it its name. William Wolfskill had developed and extensively planted the Valencia orange here in the 19th century. It is one of the last remaining examples of a citrus packing house in Fullerton.

History
The packing house was built in 1924 by the Union Pacific Railway to complement its neighboring train station. The   packing house first shipped oranges under the Elephant label, and was later leased by grower C.C. Chapman to pack his Old Mission brand oranges.

After it fell out of use for orange shipping, the warehouse was used by a lawn furniture distributor.  In 1960 the Union Pacific Railway sold the structure, which has been used by a variety of tenants. It was expanded in 1971. The railway station has since been relocated.

Description
The packing house design is predominantly in the Mission Revival Style, with Spanish Colonial Revival Style architectural elements. The interior is lighted by two sawtooth roof monitors. The north side faces onto railroad tracks that run immediately adjacent to the packing house.

Railroad shipping
The Elephant Packing House was located on the Union Pacific Railroad line for shipping to the East Coast and elsewhere. The line is no longer in service.

A Mission Revival style Union Pacific Railroad railway station (built 1923) was already adjacent. It has been preserved and been moved to the Fullerton Transportation Center, next to the Atchison, Topeka and Santa Fe Railway station there (built 1930).

All three buildings are listed on the National Register of Historic Places.

See also
National Register of Historic Places listings in Orange County, California — listed with images and article links.
Index: History of Orange County, California

References

External links
 City of Fullerton: Elephant Packing House

Packing houses
Orange production
Buildings and structures in Fullerton, California
National Register of Historic Places in Orange County, California
Industrial buildings completed in 1924
Agricultural buildings and structures on the National Register of Historic Places in California
Agricultural buildings and structures on the National Register of Historic Places
Agriculture in California
History of Orange County, California
Mission Revival architecture in California
Tourist attractions in Fullerton, California